Kerr Lake State Recreation Area is a North Carolina state park in Vance and Warren counties, North Carolina, in the United States. Located north of Henderson near the North Carolina-Virginia border, it includes  of woodlands along the shores of the  man-made Kerr Lake. The lake, and thus the park, are named for Congressman John H. Kerr, who supported the original lake project.

See also
 John H. Kerr Dam

References

External links
 
 Kerr Lake at Vance County Tourism website
 Kerr Lake Park Watch

Protected areas established in 1981
Protected areas of Vance County, North Carolina
Protected areas of Warren County, North Carolina
State parks of North Carolina
Nature centers in North Carolina
1981 establishments in North Carolina